Kima montana is a species of jumping spider in the genus Kima that lives in Kenya. The female was first described by Wanda Wesołowska and Małgorzata Szeremeta in 2001.

References

Endemic fauna of Kenya
Salticidae
Fauna of Kenya
Spiders of Africa
Spiders described in 2001